The Mennonite Disaster Service (MDS) is a volunteer network through which various groups within the Anabaptist tradition assist people affected by disasters in North America.  The organization was founded in 1950 and was incorporated as a 501(c)(3) non-profit organization in 1993.

The MDS currently involves more than 3,000 members of the Mennonite, Amish and Brethren in Christ churches (BIC).  The primary focus of the service is cleanup, repair, and the rebuilding of homes.  The work of the group supplements the disaster relief provided by the Red Cross.  The Mennonite Disaster Service also works closely with Mennonite Central Committee.

A quarterly newsletter called Behind the Hammer is published.

The volunteer amateur radio group Mennonet provides communication services for MDS.  Radio equipment was first deployed by MDS in 1960.

References

Further reading
Detweiler, Lowell (2000) The Hammer Rings Hope:  Photos and Stories from Fifty Years of Mennonite Disaster Service. Scottdale PA: Herald Press. 
Wiebe, Katie Funk (1976) Day of Disaster. Scottdale, PA: Herald Press.  
Wiebe, Vernon (1960) Handbook for Mennonite Disaster Service Volunteers.  Kansas:  Mennonite Disaster Service.  ASIN B0007G0VG0.

External links
 MDS Sowing Seeds of Service
 MDS on Youtube

Anabaptism
Mennonitism in Canada
Mennonitism in the United States
Peace churches
Emergency organizations
Religious service organizations
Organizations established in 1950
1950 establishments in the United States